Facelinopsis marioni is a species of sea slug, an aeolid nudibranch, a marine gastropod mollusc in the family Facelinidae.

Distribution
This species was described from the Rade de Villefranche-sur-Mer, France.

Description 
The typical adult size of this species is 10 mm.

References 

Facelinidae
Gastropods described in 1888